Balašević is a Serbo-Croatian surname, a patronymic derived from the masculine given name Balaš (Hungarian: Balázs). It may refer to:

 Đorđe Balašević (1953–2021), Serbian singer-songwriter
 Predrag Balašević (born 1974), ethnic Romanian politician from Serbia

References

Croatian surnames
Serbian surnames
Bosnian surnames
Patronymic surnames